Emax, E-max or similar may refer to:

 E-mu Emax, a line of sound samplers
 E-Max School of Engineering and Applied Research, an engineering college in Haryana, India
 E-Max shopping mall, within the Kowloonbay International Trade & Exhibition Centre
 Maximal efficacy, or intrinsic activity
 IPS E.max, a type of lithium disilicate glass-ceramic used in dental restorations such as dental bridges and crowns
 "Emax I", "Emax II", and "Emax III", songs by Destroyer from the 1998 album City of Daughters

See also
 Emac (disambiguation)
 Emacs, a family of text editors